The Rajasthan Royals (often abbreviated as RR) are  a franchise cricket team based in Jaipur, Rajasthan, that plays in the Indian Premier League (IPL). Founded in 2008 as one of the initial eight IPL franchises, the team is based at the Sawai Mansingh Stadium in Jaipur.

The team won the inaugural edition of the IPL under the captaincy of Shane Warne, despite being written off as a title contender by the media and fans. The Royals were also the runners-up of the 2013 Champions League Twenty20 under Rahul Dravid's captaincy.

On 14 July 2015, the verdict reached by a panel appointed by the Supreme Court of India suspended Rajasthan Royals and Chennai Super Kings for two years over a 2013 betting scandal, meaning they could not participate in both the 2016 and 2017 IPL tournaments. They returned to the competition for the 2018 season.

Listing criteria 
In general the top five are listed in each category (except when there is a tie for the last place among the five, when all the tied record holders are noted).

Listing notation 
Team notation
 (200–3) indicates that a team scored 200 runs for three wickets and the innings was closed, either due to a successful run chase or if no playing time remained
 (200) indicates that a team scored 200 runs and was all out

Batting notation
 (100) indicates that a batsman scored 100 runs and was out
 (100*) indicates that a batsman scored 100 runs and was not out

Bowling notation
 (5–20) indicates that a bowler has captured 5 wickets while conceding 20 runs

Currently playing
  indicates a current cricketer

Start Date
 indicates the date the match starts

Team records

Team Performance

Team wins, losses and draws

Result records

Greatest win margin (by runs)

Greatest win margin (by balls remaining)

Greatest win margins (by wickets)

Narrowest win margin (by runs)

Narrowest win margin (by balls remaining)

Narrowest win margins (by wickets)

Tied Matches

Greatest loss margin (by runs)

Greatest loss margin (by balls remaining)

Greatest loss margins (by wickets)

Narrowest loss margin (by runs)

Narrowest loss margin (by balls remaining)

Narrowest loss margins (by wickets)

Team scoring records

Highest Totals

Lowest Totals

Highest Totals Conceded

Lowest Totals Conceded

Highest match aggregate

Lowest match aggregate

Individual Records (Batting)

Most runs

Highest individual score

Highest career average

Highest strike rates

Most half-centuries

Most centuries

Most Sixes

Most Fours

Highest strike rates in an inning

Most sixes in an inning

Most fours in an inning

Most runs in a series

Most ducks

Individual Records (Bowling)

Most career wickets

Best figures in an innings

Best career average

Best career economy rate

Best career strike rate

Most four-wickets (& over) hauls in an innings

Best economy rates in an inning

Best strike rates in an inning

Most runs conceded in a match

Most wickets in a series

Hat-trick

Individual Records (Wicket-keeping)

Most career dismissals

Most career catches

Most career stumpings

Most dismissals in an innings

Most dismissals in a series

Individual Records (Fielding)

Most career catches

Most catches in an innings

Most catches in a series

Individual Records (Other)

Most matches

Most matches as captain

Partnership Record

Highest partnerships by wicket

Highest partnerships by runs

External links
Rajasthan Royals on IPLT20.com
Official Site

References 

Stats
Lists of Indian cricket records and statistics
Stats
Indian Premier League lists